Joseph Hudson (1778-1854) was a veteran of the battle of the Glorious First of June and later a tobacconist to the British royal family who ran a cigar divan in Oxford Street, London.

Early life
Hudson was born in 1778. In 1794 he was a midshipman in the Royal Navy who served under Admiral Earl Howe during the battle of the Glorious First of June (Loutherbourg, 1794) between the British and French navies during the French Revolutionary Wars.

Career

Hudson was a tobacconist to the British royal family. His premises were at 132 Oxford Street where he ran a cigar divan frequented by sporting figures.

Death
Hudson died in 1854. He is buried at Kensal Green Cemetery. His Will is held by the British National Archives at Kew. In October 2015, it was reported that his mausoleum (1850), which is Grade II listed, had been placed on the Heritage at Risk Register with Historic England due to potential damage from plant growth.

See also
Chartres Biron (a descendant)

References 

British businesspeople
1778 births
1854 deaths
Tobacconists